Take What You Need is the thirteenth studio album by Robin Trower, and the second to feature Davey Pattison on lead vocals.

Track listing

''The album was re-released as part of a 2 disc set called The Complete Atlantic Recordings in 2020 by Wounded Bird Records.  It included a bonus track

"Shattered (live version) (no mention of date or location) – 4:43

Personnel
Robin Trower Band
 Davey Pattison – vocals
 Robin Trower – guitars
 Dave Bronze – bass
 Pete Thompson – drums
Guests
 Reg Webb – keyboards
 Robert Martin – keyboards, background vocals
 Chris Thompson – background vocals

References 

Source - Album cover and liner notes.

External links 
 TrowerPower.com - Official website
 Robin Trower - Take What You Need (1988) album releases & credits at Discogs
 Robin Trower - Take What You Need (1988) album to be listened on Spotify
 Robin Trower - Take What You Need (1988) album to be listened on YouTube

1988 albums
Robin Trower albums
Atlantic Records albums